Culeolus is a genus of ascidian tunicates in the family Pyuridae.

Species within the genus Culeolus include:
 Culeolus annulatus Sluiter, 1904 
 Culeolus anonymus Monniot & Monniot, 1976 
 Culeolus antarcticus Vinogradova, 1962 
Culeolus barryi 
 Culeolus caudatus Monniot & Monniot, 1991 
 Culeolus easteeri Tokioka, 1967 
 Culeolus easteri Tokioka, 1967 
 Culeolus elegans Monniot & Monniot, 1991 
 Culeolus gigas Sluiter, 1904 
 Culeolus herdmani Sluiter, 1904 
 Culeolus hospitalis Monniot & Monniot, 2003 
 Culeolus likae Sanamyan & Sanamyan, 2002 
 Culeolus longipedunculatus Vinogradova, 1970 
 Culeolus moseleyi Herdman, 1881 
 Culeolus murrayi Herdman, 1881 
 Culeolus nadejdae Sanamyan, 1992 
 Culeolus parvus Millar, 1970 
 Culeolus pinguis Monniot & Monniot, 1982 
 Culeolus pyramidalis Ritter, 1907 
 Culeolus quadrula Sluiter, 1904 
 Culeolus recumbens Herdman, 1881 
 Culeolus robustus Vinogradova, 1970 
 Culeolus sluiteri Ritter, 1913 
 Culeolus suhmi Herdman, 1881 
 Culeolus tenuis Vinogradova, 1970 
 Culeolus thysanotus Sluiter, 1904 
 Culeolus wyville-thomsoni Herdman, 1881

Species names currently considered to be synonyms:
 Culeolus littoralis Kott, 1956: synonym of Pyura littoralis (Kott, 1956) 
 Culeolus moseley Herdman, 1881: synonym of Culeolus moseleyi Herdman, 1881 
 Culeolus perlucidus Herdman, 1881: synonym of Fungulus perlucidus (Herdman, 1881) 
 Culeolus tanneri Verrill, 1885: synonym of Culeolus suhmi Herdman, 1881 
 Culeolus uschakovi Redikorzev, 1941: synonym of Culeolus suhmi Herdman, 1881 
 Culeolus wyvillethomsoni Herdman, 1881: synonym of Culeolus wyville-thomsoni Herdman, 1881

References

Stolidobranchia
Tunicate genera